Marten Beinema (26 November 1932 - 20 August 2008) was a Dutch politician of the Anti-Revolutionary Party (ARP) and its successor the Christian Democratic Appeal (CDA).

Beinema was a member of the municipal council of Middelburg from 1971 to 1978. He was also an alderman of Middelburg from 1972 to 1975.

From 1975 to 1977 and again from 1978 to 1998 he was a member of the House of Representatives.

From 1978 to 1982 he was also a member of the States of Zeeland.

Beinema was also a chess player and participated in the Tata Steel Chess Tournament.

References 
  Parlement.com biography

1932 births
2008 deaths
Aldermen in Zeeland
People from Middelburg, Zeeland
Anti-Revolutionary Party politicians
Christian Democratic Appeal politicians
Dutch chess players
Members of the House of Representatives (Netherlands)
Members of the Provincial Council of Zeeland
Municipal councillors in Zeeland
People from Dordrecht
Utrecht University alumni
20th-century chess players